Haunted Hills is an Indian Hindi-language horror romantic film, written and directed by Sanjeev Kumar Rajput. The films stars Zuber K. Khan and Diana Khan in the lead roles.

Cast
 Zuber K. Khan as Rohit
 Gavie Chahal
 Diana Khan
 Krishna Chaturvedi
 Mansi Gupta
 Surendra Pal Singh
 Adarsh Kumar
 Nitin Dixit
 Omkar Sharma

Plot
The film revolves around a honeymooning couple. The wife dies accidentally, and her soul remains in a painting that she leaves incomplete. Her soul murders her husband.

Production
This film was shot in Nainital and Mussoorie in Uttarakhand (India).

Soundtrack 

The music of the film is composed by Asif Chandwani and sung by singers including Palak Muchhal, Mohammed Irfan and Dev Negi.

Release
The film was released in India on 28 February 2020.

The film was premiered on Zee Cinema on 15 November 2020.

See also
List of Bollywood horror films

References

External links
 
 

2020 films
2020 romance films
2020s Hindi-language films
Films set in Mumbai
Indian romantic horror films
2020 horror films
2020s English-language films